Skidelsky is a surname. Notable people with the surname include:

Robert Skidelsky (born 1939), British economic historian
S. J. Simon (Seca Jascha Skidelsky)